Jack Austin may refer to:

Jack Austin (politician) (born 1932), Canadian politician
Jack Austin (footballer) (1910–1983), Australian rules football player
Jack L. Austin (born 1945), Australian rules football player
Jack Austin (rugby league), rugby league footballer of the 1960s and 1970s
Jack Austin (weightlifter)

See also
John Austin (disambiguation)